Kozlovo is a rural locality (a village) in Gorodishchenskoye Rural Settlement, Nyuksensky District, Vologda Oblast, Russia. The population was 25 as of 2002.

Geography 
Kozlovo is located 36 km southeast of Nyuksenitsa (the district's administrative centre) by road. Kazakovo is the nearest rural locality.

References 

Rural localities in Nyuksensky District